Abu Muhammad Sulaiman ibn Mihran al-Asadi al-Kahili (680764/65) (سليمان بن مهران) also known as al-Amash(الأعمش) was a Muslim scholar of the generation of Tabi'un. He was a notable Muhaddith and Qāriʾ. Due to his poor eyesight, people used to call him al-Amash.

Biography
Al-Amash was born in Kufa in 680 (61 AH). He was a freedman of the Kahil clan from the Banu Assad tribe. His father had moved to Kufa from Damavand, Iran.

Al-A’mash died in 764 (147 AH) in Kufa, but most historians say that he died in the month of Rabi al-Awwal 765 (148 AH).

His notable students include Abu Hanifa, Ibn al-Mubarak, Sufyan al-Thawri, Sufyan ibn ʽUyaynah and Al-Fuḍayl ibn ʻIyāḍ.

References

680 births
765 deaths
7th-century Arabs
8th-century Arabs
Tabi‘un hadith narrators